Spoke is the debut studio album of Calexico, an Americana/indie rock band from Arizona. It was initially released in Germany (Hausmusik label) under the group name Spoke.

Track listing
 "Low Expectations" (Burns, Convertino) – 2:37
 "Mind The Gap" (Burns) – 0:52
 "Mazurra" (Convertino) – 1:46
 "Sanchez" (Burns, Convertino) – 3:18
 "Haul" (Burns, Convertino) – 1:21
 "Slag" (Burns, Convertino) – 2:29
 "Paper Route" (Bundy, Burns, Convertino) – 2:01
 "Glimpse" (Burns, Convertino) – 2:40
 "Navy Cut" (Burns, Convertino) – 0:29
 "Spokes" (Burns) – 3:38
 "Scout" (Burns, Convertino) – 2:09
 "Point Vicente" (Burns, Coffman, Convertino) – 3:56
 "Wash" (Burns) – 2:35
 "Ice Cream Jeep" (Burns) – 0:31
 "Windjammer" (Burns, Convertino) – 2:38
 "Mazurka" (Convertino) – 1:20
 "Removed" (Burns, Coffman) – 3:52
 "Hitch" (Burns, Convertino) – 2:53
 "Stinging Nettle" (Burns, Coffman) – 3:41

Personnel
 John Convertino—drums, vibes, marimba, guitar, accordion
 Joey Burns—bass, cello, guitar, mandolin, vocals, accordion
 Tasha Bundy—drums
 Bridget Keating—violin
 David Coffman—guitar

References

1996 debut albums
Calexico (band) albums
Quarterstick Records albums